The Red Strings Club is a cyberpunk adventure game developed by Deconstructeam and published by Devolver Digital.

Gameplay and plot
The Red Strings Club is an adventure game set in a cyberpunk world. In this world, devices implanted in humans have become commonplace as a way to alter one's physical features and mental functions; a corporation called Supercontinent Ltd., led by a mysterious CEO, is at the forefront of this human implant industry. The game itself centers around three main (playable) characters: Brandeis, an enhanced human and "freelance hacker"; Donovan, an implantless human and owner of The Red Strings Club; and Akara-184, an android formerly owned by Supercontinent to administer implant surgery to customers and who possesses advanced empathy capabilities. Donovan, Brandeis, and Akara-184 are working together to stop Supercontinent from releasing a system known as Social Psyche Welfare, which alters the minds of all implanted humans in order to eliminate emotions such as anger and depression; Donovan's interactions with Akara-184 and employees of Supercontinent encourages the player to consider the role of and extent to which technology should alter one's humanity.

The Red Strings Club utilizes several different styles of gameplay throughout with each of its playable characters. The bulk of the game involves Donovan mixing different types of drinks in order to bring out certain emotions in his bar's patrons, which allows him to probe them for information; however, some emotional states are more volatile than others, running the risk of cutting the conversation short and missing out on certain intelligence that could have been collected. At the end of each encounter, Akara-184 will test Donovan on each character's motivations and feelings; if he guesses most of the questions correctly, he receives an item that can enhance his drinks (and, in one instance, gains access to a new character).

While playing as Akara-184 within a Supercontinent Ltd. facility, the player crafts different sets of implants made of biomass via pottery wheel that are to be inserted in clients, based on what will best help their careers or desires. Towards the end of this section of the game, the player inserts implants for Supercontinent executives, however, are encouraged by a human hacker intruder (who is associated with Brandeis), to assign them specially-designed implants that will make them less corporately-focused; the implants that the player chooses to insert will have an effect on these executives later on in the game.

At the end of the game, like Brandeis, the player infiltrates Supercontinent Ltd. headquarters in order to stop the SPW program, but needs to go through several bureaucratic hoops in order to do so; in order to achieve his goal, Brandeis uses one of his implants to impersonate Supercontinent executives and glean the information needed to access restricted files and run a virus to shut down Social Psyche Welfare. Just before succeeding, though, Brandeis is surrounded by Akara and several clones of them - it is here that Akara reveals that they are an AI of uncertain origin that's slowly been manipulating human technological process via the internet for years and intends to launch the SPW as a sort of final act. After this encounter, Brandeis is shot by Supercontinent security forces and falls out of Supercontinent's skyscraper to his demise, as seen in the beginning cutscene of the game; it is also here that it's revealed that Brandeis and Donovan are in love with each other.

Development and release
The Red Strings Club was developed by Deconstructeam. The game was announced in October 2017. The game was published by Devolver Digital and released for Windows, macOS and Linux on 22 January 2018.

It was released on Nintendo Switch in March 2019.

Reception

The Red Strings Club received "generally favorable" reviews from critics according to review aggregator Metacritic.

The Spanish edition of Edge magazine gave it a 9/10.

Awards
The game won the award for "Best National Development" at the Titanium Awards 2018, whereas its other nomination was for "Best Indie Game".

Controversy
One of the characters Donovan encounters at The Red Strings Club is a woman named Larissa, a sensual marketing director for Supercontinent. Though not stated during this sequence, it is later revealed during Brandeis' section that Larissa is transgender; this is discovered when, in order to access an engineer's files, it becomes clear that the password is Larissa's "deadname" (name given at birth). In a Vice article, Danielle Riendeau criticizes the decision of Devolver Digital to reveal Larissa's gender identity via use of deadnaming, which is considered offensive, or even violent.

Paula Ruiz, a developer of The Red Strings Club who is transgender, responded to Riendeau in defense of the decision, stating "[w]e agree it's important to talk about all this stuff and denounce it, but it's also important to look at all angles of a story... Deadnaming sucks, but it's also a part of trans people's realities, and the game tries to capture that bit too, maybe not in the depth it should according to you, but at no moment was its use frivolous."

See also
 VA-11 HALL-A, another cyberpunk adventure game that involves bartending and mixing drinks
 Do Not Feed the Monkeys
 Gris

References

External links
 

2018 video games
Adventure games
Cyberpunk video games
Devolver Digital games
GameMaker Studio games
LGBT-related video games
Linux games
MacOS games
Single-player video games
Video games developed in Spain
Windows games